Malacothamnus enigmaticus is a species of flowering plant in the mallow family known by the common name enigmatic bush-mallow. It is endemic to San Diego County, California, where it is known from the desert edge of the Peninsular Ranges from the San Ysidro Mountains in the north to the Laguna Mountains in the south. It was first collected in 1938 and described as a new species to science in 2019. Prior to 2019, it had been mistakenly assigned to Malacothamnus aboriginum  and Malacothamnus densiflorus.

References

External links
Calflora Profile: Malacothamnus enigmaticus
Malacothamnus enigmaticus Photo gallery at Calphotos

Flora of California
Endemic flora of California
enigmaticus
Natural history of San Diego County, California
Plants described in 2019
Flora without expected TNC conservation status